Đuro Šurmin (September 4, 1867 – March 22, 1937) was a Croatian literary historian and politician.

Biography

He was born in Sišćani. He studied Slavic Studies, Classical Studies and philosophy at the Faculty of Philosophy in Zagreb since 1890, receiving a Ph.D. in 1897 with a thesis titled Riječi muškoga roda â-osnova u hrvatskom jeziku (Masculine â-stems in Croatian). There he worked as a teaching apprentice in Croatian and Serbian literature since 1899, becoming a regular professor in 1906, and serving as the dean in the period 1907-1908. In 1908 he was temporarily retired, in 1910 reemployed, and since 1921 permanently retired. He died in Zagreb in 1937.

Political engagement

Šurmin was actively involved in politics. Since 1906 he served as a parliamentarian for the Croatian People's Progressive Party, supporting the Croat-Serb Coalition until 1917. In 1914-1922 he was the city councilor of Zagreb. In the National Council of the Kingdom of Serbs, Croats and Slovenes he belonged to the non-partisan group of politicians who rallied around the newspapers Male novine, serving as a commissioner for commerce, trade and industry. In the Kingdom of Serbs, Croats and Slovenes he was originally a member of the Advanced Democratic Party, then in the period 1919-1924 as member of the Croatian Community, and finally in 1925 founding the uninfluential Croatian People's Party. In 1920 he was elected to the Constituent Assembly and served as the Minister for Social Affairs, and also later as the Minister of Trade and Industry (1924-1925). His political activity in the 1930s was tied with the regime. He was particularly active in various economic bodies, such as being the President of the People's Bank for Savings and Loans in 1925-1935.

Work

His scientific work was in the fields of history of literature, history and philology:

 Povjest književnosti hrvatske i srpske (History of Croatian and Serbian Literature, 1898)
 Iz zajedničke književne prošlosti Bosne i Slavonije (From the Common Literary Past of Bosnia and Slavonia, 1901)
 Hrvatski preporod I-II (Croatian Revival, 1903–1904)
 Stvaranje Srbije (The Creation of Serbia, 1921)
 Osnovke ugovora u Londonu 1915 (The Principles of the 1915 Treaty of London, 1928)
 Vojska i hrvatska politika 1915. god. (The Army and Croatian Politics in 1915, 1932)
As part of the Monumenta historico-juridica Slavorum meridionalium project he prepared a collection of medieval, predominantly Glagolitic monuments, which were published as Hrvatski spomenici (Croatian Monuments, 1898). His legacy is preserved in the Croatian State Archives in Zagreb.

References

1867 births
1937 deaths
People from Čazma
Croatian politicians
Croatian philologists
Croatian literary historians